The Borg is a fictional alien faction from the Star Trek franchise.

Borg may also refer to:

People
 Borg (surname), list of people with the surname
 Lawrence Springborg, an Australian politician also known as "The Borg"

Places

Antarctica
 Borg Massif, a massif along the northwest side of the Penck Trough in Queen Maud Land
 Borg Mountain, a mountain standing at the northern end of Borg Massif in Queen Maud Land
 Borg Island, an island in the eastern part of the Øygarden Group

Iceland
 Borg or Borg á Mýrum, an ancient farm and church estate due west of Borgarnes

Germany
 Borg, Saarland, a village in the municipality of Perl in Saarland

Norway
 Borg, Vestvågøy, a village in Vestvågøy municipality in Nordland county
 Borg, former name of the city Sarpsborg in Østfold county
 Diocese of Borg, a geographical diocese of the Church of Norway

Egypt
 Borg El Arab, an industrial city in the governorate of Alexandria

Companies
 Borg Bryggerier, a Norwegian brewery
 BorgWarner, an automotive supply company
 BorgBuss, a Norwegian bus company

Fiction
 Various machines in the Emma Clayton novels The Roar (2009) and The Whisper
 Isak Borg, the protagonist of Ingmar Bergman's 1957 film Wild Strawberries
 Jarl Borg, a character in the TV series Vikings, played by Thorbjørn Harr

Other
 Borg (castle), a former stronghold or villa in the province of Groningen, the Netherlands
 Borg (drink), a mixed drink made in a gallon jug
 Borg (fabric)
 Borg scale, a measurement of perceived exertion in sports science
 Borg Opening, a rare chess opening
 Borg (backup software)
 Borg (cluster manager), software used by Google

See also
 Borg Bastion, a mountain in Antarctica
 Barg (disambiguation)
 Berg (disambiguation)
 Bourg (disambiguation)
 Burg (disambiguation)
 Cyborg